The 2019–20 season was Southend United's 114th year in existence and their fifth consecutive season in League One. Along with competing in League One, the club participated in the FA Cup, EFL Cup and EFL Trophy.

The season covers the period from 1 July 2019 to 30 June 2020.

Pre-season
The pre-season schedule was confirmed by the club in June 2019.

Competitions

League One

League table

Results summary

Results by matchday

Matches
On Thursday, 20 June 2019, the EFL League One fixtures were revealed.

FA Cup

The first round draw was made on 21 October 2019.

EFL Cup

The first round draw was made on 20 June. The second round draw was made on 13 August 2019 following the conclusion of all but one first round matches.

EFL Trophy

On 9 July 2019, the pre-determined group stage draw was announced with Invited clubs to be drawn on 12 July 2019.

Transfers

Transfers in

Loans in

Transfers out

Loans out

References

Southend United
Southend United F.C. seasons